Hasan Fuat Sari is a Finnish sculptor and painter. He was born in Tarsus into a Turkish family in 1953, and lives and works in Turku, Finland since 1980.

Career 
In 1973, he began his studies at the Royal Academy of Art in the Hague and graduated from the State Academy of Fine Arts in Istanbul. After his graduation Sari began working at the Istanbul Archeology Museums' sculpture atelier and also attended the completion of Izmir Archeological Museum.

In 1980, Sari moved to Finland. Since 1981 he worked as a teacher in various educational institutions including Åbo Akademi University, University of Turku (until 2014) and University of Lapland. Since 1992 he has also worked as a researcher in the Department of Cultural History at University of Turku.

The artist has opened 39 personal exhibitions and 37 group exhibitions and also participated in 29 joint exhibitions in various countries including Australia, Turkey, Finland, Belgium, France, Germany, Britain and Spain until 2017. He has formed the visual artists' group "Details From Finland" which holds exhibitions mostly abroad. He has planned and applied playground sculptures in the Kupittaa Park and Adventure Park in Turku while working for the Turku City Creative Action Department in 1984–1993.

Eyes and wheels are recurring themes in his work. He sees eyes as a symbol of observation of life and wheels as a symbol for civilisation. His works incorporate a range of materials as diverse as metal, wood, brick, scrap and recycled objects.

Sari holds numerous awards, including the Visual Artists' Association of Istanbul Visual Young Artists Competition Honorary Mention 1977, Fourth International Istanbul Festival / International Istanbul Arceological Open Air Museum Prize, and the sculptor of the year award from "Ankara Sanat Kurumu" association in 2004.

In addition to his work as a sculptor, Sari has been active in theatre, preparing sets for and performing in the Mörköooppera (Swedish: Spökoperan, English: Children's Ghost Opera) in Finland both in the Finnish and Swedish language, and in Turkey. He has served in the board of the Turku Youth Theatre.

Sari is a member of the Association of Finnish Sculptors.

Gallery

References

External links
 https://kuvataiteilijamatrikkeli.fi/taiteilija/sari-hasan-fuat

1953 births
Living people
Finnish painters
Finnish people of Turkish descent
20th-century Finnish sculptors
21st-century Finnish sculptors
Academic staff of Åbo Akademi University
Academic staff of the University of Turku
Academic staff of the University of Lapland